Andreas Kallinskis-Roïdis was a Greek Army officer. 

Andreas Kallinskis-Roïdis was born in Athens in 1868. His father was Efstratios Roïdis, who belonged to one of the oldest Athenian aristocratic families. His mother was the daughter of the Polish philhellene Andrzej Kallinski (hellenized as Andreas Kallinskis), who fought in the Greek War of Independence and became secretary to Kings Otto and George I, and of Eleni Sekeri, the daughter of the merchant and leading Filiki Etaireia member Panagiotis Sekeris. Kallinskis studied in Germany and entered the Hellenic Army in 1887 as a cavalry cornet. He participated in the expeditionary force sent to Crete during the Greco-Turkish War of 1897, in the Balkan Wars and in the Asia Minor Campaign, where, as a major general, he commanded the Greek army's only cavalry division. He retired with the rank of lieutenant general.

His son, Andreas Kallinskis, also became an officer, rising to the rank of major general. He fought in the Sacred Band during World War II and subsequently played a leading role in the establishment of the Mountain Raiding Companies. His daughter Maria married Marshal and Prime Minister Alexandros Papagos.

1868 births
20th-century deaths
20th-century Greek people
Hellenic Army lieutenant generals
Greek military personnel of the Greco-Turkish War (1919–1922)
Military personnel from Athens
Greek people of Polish descent